Dyego Henrique Zuffo (born 5 August 1989) is a Brazilian futsal player who plays as a winger for FC Barcelona and the Brazilian national futsal team.

Honours
UEFA Futsal Champions League third place: 2018–19

References

External links
Liga Nacional Fútbol Sala profile

1989 births
Living people
Futsal forwards
Brazilian men's futsal players
Brazilian expatriate sportspeople in Spain
FC Barcelona Futsal players